Magnier Peninsula is the mostly ice-covered peninsula projecting 18 km in northwest direction from Graham Coast in Graham Land, Antarctica.  It is 17 km wide between Leroux Bay to the northeast and Bigo Bay to the southwest.  Magnier Peaks rise in the northern part of the peninsula, while Lisiya Ridge occupy its base.

The peninsula is named by Chile, taking its name from Magnier Peaks.

Location

British mapping in 1971.

Maps

 British Antarctic Territory.  Scale 1:200000 topographic map. DOS 610 Series, Sheet W 65 64.  Directorate of Overseas Surveys, Tolworth, UK, 1971.

References
 Magnier Peninsula. SCAR Composite Gazetteer of Antarctica

Peninsulas of Graham Land
Graham Coast